Douglas Mitchell (1939–2022) was a Canadian Football League player, executive, and commissioner.

Douglas or Doug Mitchell may also refer to:

Doug Mitchell (Canadian football) (born 1942), retired Canadian Football League offensive lineman
Doug Mitchell (film producer) (born 1952), British television and film producer
Douglas Mitchell (scientist) (born 1980), chemistry professor at the University of Illinois at Urbana-Champaign 
Douglas W. Mitchell (1953–2020), American economist and polymath